Revocation is an American technical death metal band from Boston, Massachusetts, consisting of guitarist and vocalist Dave Davidson, bassist Brett Bamberger and drummer Ash Pearson. The band has released eight studio albums, two EPs, and ten music videos since their formation.

History

Background (Cryptic Warning) (2000–2005)
In 2000, guitarist/vocalist Dave Davidson, drummer Phil Dubois-Coyne and bassist Anthony Buda, met while attending a high school in Boston, Massachusetts. Influenced by Guns N' Roses and Metallica, the trio formed Cryptic Warning. As Cryptic Warning, the band recorded its first demo in 2002 and gained an underground following in Boston, and surrounding area. A second demo, Internally Reviled, was recorded in 2004. In 2005, Cryptic Warning recorded and released an independent album, Sanity's Aberration, but was not content with the quality of the album's production. Remembering those recordings, Davidson said: "We didn't record the album with a metal guy, so we didn't get the sound we wanted. The heaviest reference in our producer's discography was The Cult. A lot of people still love that record—our old-school fans who used to show up for all of the shows—but to us, we weren't really satisfied with the production of that. We felt it was one of the mistakes we made."

First four albums (2006–2013)
In 2006, Cryptic Warning disbanded and Revocation formed with the lineup intact. Davidson commented: "I think, looking a little deeper into it, we made a lot of mistakes with Cryptic Warning. We were younger and didn't really know what we were doing, so Revocation was us starting fresh with a clean slate and revoking our past mistakes." With a direction change, Revocation promptly recorded a three-song demo titled Summon the Spawn, and in 2008 they went back into the studio to record their first full-length album, Empire of the Obscene. The full length was self-released, and the band financed its own tour, attracting the interest of several record labels. Revocation subsequently signed to Relapse Records.

The band did a number of regional shows before recording their second full-length album, Existence Is Futile, released on September 29, 2009. The album was described by Allmusic as "one of the best pure metal albums of 2009", while Spin magazine named Revocation as one of the ten artists to watch in 2010. In October 2009, the band performed for the Relapse showcase at CMJ Music Marathon.
On August 16, 2011, the band released their third full-length album, Chaos of Forms. Their fourth full-length studio release, self-titled Revocation, was released on August 5, 2013.

Deathless and Great Is Our Sin (2014–2016)
In early April 2014, it was announced that Revocation had signed with Metal Blade Records and that the recording of a new album had begun. The band's fifth full-length Deathless, was released on October 14, 2014.  Revocation embarked on a fall tour in the U.S. with Crowbar, Havok, Fit For An Autopsy, and Armed for Apocalypse. Following the fall tour, they trekked across Europe with Cannibal Corpse and Aeon.

In June 2015, drummer Phil Dubois-Coyne announced that he was leaving the band. He was replaced by Ash Pearson, the former drummer of 3 Inches of Blood.

In September 2015, the band announced that Empire of the Obscene was to be re-issued on November 13, 2015 via Metal Blade Records. Remixed and remastered, the album included bonus tracks from their 2006 EP, Summon the Spawn.

In May 2016, the band announced their sixth studio album, Great Is Our Sin. The album was released on July 22, 2016 via Metal Blade Records.

The Outer Ones and Netherheaven (2017–present) 
On November 13, 2017, Davidson revealed that writing had begun on the band's next album in an interview with Metal Injection and that the album is planned to be released in 2018. On February 5, 2018, the band hinted that recording had begun via posts on the band's various social media outlets. On April 5, 2018, the band announced that tracking for the new album was completed at Planet Z Studios. On May 15, 2018, the band teased 20 seconds of a new song and what appears to be a release date of September 28, 2018.

On June 5, 2018, the band revealed the title of their seventh album, The Outer Ones, released on September 28, 2018 via Metal Blade. The band has also announced their second-ever North American headline tour in September and October 2018, with Exhumed, Rivers of Nihil and Yautja as support acts.

On July 10, 2018, the band revealed the track listing and cover artwork of The Outer Ones, along with a music video for "Of Unworldly Origin", the first single of the album. 

On June 20, 2020, rhythm guitarist Dan Gargiulo left the band, citing a desire to "focus on other musical and life endeavors". The band is currently working on their eighth album as a trio.

On June 16, 2022, Revocation announced that their new album would be titled Netherheaven. On July 6, it was revealed the album would be released on September 9, and the album's first single, "Diabolical Majesty," was also released.

Musical style and influences 
The music of Revocation has been described by journalists as a fusion of technical death metal and thrash metal. The characteristics that define Revocation's sound include a "complex guitar-bass interplay" of dissonant riffs, bass breaks and "shredding" guitar solos united by "galloping" double bass drums, death metal tempos, hard rock breakdowns and grooves. Vocals range from death growls to grindcore screams, while "still recognizable as a human voice". Starting with the self-titled album, the band has been using seven-string guitars to expand their range.

Music critics have pointed out that Davidson's guitar playing style is the prominent aspect of Revocation's sound. Davidson developed his playing technique by attending the Berklee College of Music, where he focused on polyrhythm for jazz. This musical education brought him an expertise in both playing and songwriting, while "some of the atonal aspects of jazz gave him a different perspective on composing and soloing."

Recalling his earliest influences, Davidson cites Slash, Dimebag Darrell, and Marty Friedman. Davidson says that as a band, Revocation has a wide range of influences, and among these are groups such as Children of Bodom, Exhorder, Dark Angel, Slayer, Megadeth, Pestilence, Atheist, Gorguts, Forbidden, Spastic Ink, Martyr, and Exodus. Davidson has also cited the "raw energy" of the DIY metal shows in the Boston underground scene as an inspiration to get proactive and get the band working.

Regarding the band's rhythm section, critics have different opinions; while About.com stated that Buda and Dubois-Coyne "practice their own brutal brand of stop-on-a-dime precision with merciless intensity", Decibel magazine wrote that when Davidson is soloing, "the rest of band often fails to compensate." In contrast Allmusic said: "Perhaps the most astonishing thing about Revocation, though, is that they're a trio."

Following the addition of Dan Gargiulo as rhythm guitarist in 2010, Revocation's sound adopted more two-guitar sections, with Gargiulo also providing songwriting credits on each release since Teratogenesis (2012). Gargiulo has cited classical guitar as a stronger influence in his songwriting, as opposed to the heavy jazz influence in Davidson's songs.

Members 

Current members
 Dave Davidson – lead guitar, lead vocals (2006–present)
 Brett Bamberger – bass (2012–present)
 Ash Pearson – drums (2015–present)

Former members
 Anthony Buda – bass, backing vocals (2006–2012)
 Phil Dubois-Coyne – drums (2006–2015)
 Dan Gargiulo – rhythm guitar, backing vocals (2010–2020)

Live musicians
 Jon "The Charn" Rice – drums (2014)
 Alex Rüdinger – drums (2015)
 Noah Young – rhythm guitar, backing vocals (2022–present)

Timeline

Discography

Studio albums

EPs

Music videos

References

External links
 
 
 Revocation at Metal Blade Records

2000 establishments in Massachusetts
American technical death metal musical groups
American thrash metal musical groups
Heavy metal musical groups from Massachusetts
Metal Blade Records artists
Musical groups established in 2000
Musical groups from Boston
Musical quartets
Relapse Records artists